Zachariah Ditetso (born 8 August 1964) is a Botswana long-distance runner. He competed in the men's 5000 metres at the 1992 Summer Olympics.

References

External links
 

1964 births
Living people
Athletes (track and field) at the 1992 Summer Olympics
Botswana male long-distance runners
Olympic athletes of Botswana
Place of birth missing (living people)